James Nicholas Gabriel (February 26, 1923 – November 26, 1991) was an American lawyer and judge from Massachusetts.

Early life and education
He was born in Brooklyn, New York and graduated from Cambridge Rindge and Latin School. He attended Boston College for two years before enlisting in the military. He graduated from Boston College Law School with a Bachelor of Laws in 1949. He later earned a Master of Laws from New York University School of Law.

Military service
He enlisted and served in the United States Army Air Forces during World War II.

Legal career
He was in private practice before working for the state government of Massachusetts.

He served as an assistant attorney general for public works under Massachusetts Attorneys General Edward Brooke, Ed Martin, and Elliot Richardson.

He served as the United States Attorney for the District of Massachusetts from 1971 to 1972 and again from 1973 to 1977. From 1977 to 1990 he was a United States bankruptcy court judge for the District of Massachusetts. During his last four years on the bench he was the court's chief judge.

Political career
He is a former member of the Massachusetts Republican Committee. He is a former chairman of the Cambridge Republican City Committee and the Young Republican Club of Cambridge.

Personal life & death
He married Helen Rawan and the couple had five children. He died on November 26, 1991 in Lexington, Massachusetts.

References

1923 births
1991 deaths
Boston College Law School alumni
Boston College alumni
Massachusetts Republicans
United States Army Air Forces personnel of World War II
New York University School of Law alumni
People from Lexington, Massachusetts
Judges of the United States bankruptcy courts
20th-century American judges
United States Attorneys for the District of Massachusetts
20th-century American lawyers